Battle of Barcelona may refer to

 Battle of Barcelona, a naval battle during the War of the Two Peters in 1359.
 Battle of Barcelona, a naval battle during the Franco-Spanish War (1635–1659) in 1642.
 Landing at Barcelona (1704), an aborted landing taking place in 1704.
 A nickname for the riots following the 1972 European Cup Winners Cup.

See also
 Siege of Barcelona (disambiguation)